The Museum of Urban and Contemporary Art (MUCA) is an art museum in Munich's old town, Germany.

Description
The museum is located at Hotterstraße 12 (in the former substation of the municipal utility, in the Hackenviertel near Marienplatz) and was opened on December 9, 2016. 

It shows urban art on an area of over 2,000 square meters and holds works by Shepard Fairey, Zeus , David Choe , OSGEMEOS, and Banksy.

It was founded by Christian and Stephanie Utz. Christian Utz declared: 

The building's front side was designed by Stohead. The Museum was listed in the Top 10 German galleries to visit in 2019.

The exhibitions are accompanied by a program with artist and expert discussions, readings, tours and workshops. In 2019, the MUCA Museum and its projects counted over 100,000 visitors.

Exhibitions
 STREETOPOLY I & II (2017)
 THE ART OF WRITING (2017)
 BUNTE Art (June 2018) in collaboration with Hubert Burda Media: exhibited artists Andy Warhol with the painting Magazine and History, Mirko Borsche, Carsten Fock, Roger Fritz, Hell Gette, Olaf Nicolai, Anselm Reyle, Benjamin Roeder, Stefan Strumbel, Laurence de Valmy, Mia Florentine Weiss und Wolfgang Wilde
 KUNSTLABOR  13 October to 31 December 2018
 Urban Fine Art II with 20 artworks of Banksy (2019)
 Women in Street Art (2019)
 SWOON – Time Capsule (2020)

References

External links
 Official website
 MUCA in the Museumsportal Bayern

2016 establishments in Germany
Art museums established in 2016
Art museums and galleries in Munich
Modern art museums in Germany